Ty Loomis (born May 1, 1979 in La Crosse, Wisconsin) is a male beach volleyball player from the United States. He won the silver medal in the men's beach team competition at the 2007 Pan American Games in Rio de Janeiro, Brazil, partnering Hans Stolfus. The pair became the first United States men's team to medal in the Pan Am Games when they placed second in 2007.

References

 

1979 births
Living people
American men's beach volleyball players
Beach volleyball players at the 2007 Pan American Games
Sportspeople from La Crosse, Wisconsin
Pan American Games silver medalists for the United States
Pan American Games medalists in volleyball
Medalists at the 2007 Pan American Games